The Nymphidiini are one of the larger tribes of metalmark butterflies (family Riodinidae). As numerous Riodinidae genera have not yet been unequivocally assigned to a tribe, the genus list is preliminary. The Theopina subtribe was formerly considered a distinct tribe Theopini.

Selected genera

Subtribe Nymphidiina
Adelotypa
Calociasma
Calospila
Catocyclotis
Dysmathia
Hypophylla
Joiceya
Livendula
Menander
Minotauros
Mycastor
Nymphidium
Pandemos
Periplacis
Rodinia
Setabis
Zelotaea

Subtribe Aricorina
Ariconias
Aricoris
Subtribe Lemoniadina
Juditha
Lemonias
Synargis
Thisbe
Subtribe Theopina
Archaeonympha
Behemothia
Calicosama
Protonymphidia
Theope

 
Riodininae
Taxa named by Henry Walter Bates
Butterfly tribes